The Pont de Bir-Hakeim (English: Bridge of Bir-Hakeim), formerly the Pont de Passy (Bridge of Passy), is a bridge that crosses the Seine in Paris. It connects the 15th and 16th arrondissement, passing through the Île aux Cygnes. The bridge, made of steel, is the second to have stood at the site. It was constructed between 1903 and 1905, replacing an earlier bridge that had been erected in 1878. An arch bridge, it is 237 metres (777 ft) long and 24.7 metres (81 ft) wide.

It was designed by the architect Jean-Camille Formigé, who also designed the Viaduc d'Austerlitz, the Jardin des Serres d'Auteuil, as well as the park below the Sacré-Cœur; he also restored the Roman amphitheatre in Arles and the Roman theatre in Orange.

Structure

The bridge has two levels: one for motor vehicles and pedestrians, the other being a viaduct (Viaduc de Passy) built above the first one, through which passes Line 6 of the Paris Métro. The railway viaduct is supported by metal colonnades, except where it passes over the Île aux Cygnes, where it rests on a masonry arch. Many commemorative plates decorate the viaduct bridge, including several dedicated to soldiers fallen in Belgium during the Second World War.

In addition, the central arch of the viaduct, at the level of the island, is decorated with four monumental stone statues in high-relief:  figures of Science and Labour by Jules-Felix Coutan, Electricity and Commerce by Jean Antoine Injalbert. The road level of the bridge extends out in a belvedere where it passes over the Île aux Cygnes which covers the eastern end of the island. Here stands a statue named La France renaissante.

Name
Originally named the Pont de Passy (after the former commune of Passy, which it reaches), it was renamed in 1948 to commemorate the Battle of Bir Hakeim, fought by Free French forces against the German Afrika Korps in 1942.

Popular culture
Many movies have featured the bridge, including Rififi, Ascenseur pour l'échafaud, Zazie dans le Métro, Last Tango in Paris, Peur sur la ville, National Treasure: Book of Secrets and Inception. A music video for Ayumi Hamasaki'''s 10th anniversary single "Mirrorcle World''" was also filmed here.

Gallery

See also
 Listing of the work of Jean Antoine Injalbert-French sculptor
 List of crossings of the Seine

References

Bridges over the River Seine in Paris
Bridges completed in 1905
1905 establishments in France